Timothy Smyczek (born December 30, 1987) is an American former professional tennis player. He made three quarterfinals on the main tour as well as the semi-finals of Newport in 2018. Additionally he won seven Challenger titles. He achieved a career-high singles ranking of World No. 68 in April 2015. Smyczek recorded wins over several notable players in his career including Kei Nishikori, John Isner, Ivo Karlović, Sam Querrey, Robby Ginepri, Gilles Müller, and Benjamin Becker.

Personal life
Smyczek plays the violin and wants to be a lawyer when his tennis career is over. He is good friends with Mardy Fish. He is also a Roman Catholic and a cooperator of Opus Dei. On November 21, 2015, Smyczek married Ana Pier.

Tennis career

Juniors
As a junior, Smyczek reached as high as No. 14 in the world combined rankings in January 2005.

Pro tour
Smyczek reached the quarterfinals of the SAP Open in 2011, beating Kei Nishikori en route, but lost to Gaël Monfils. He qualified again in 2012, but lost to Mardy Fish in the first round.

In April 2012, he won his first Challenger title, defeating Frank Dancevic in the Tallahassee final, Dancevic retiring after losing the first set 5–7.

For the 2013 Australian Open, Smyczek earned entry as the last entry in the field and lucky loser, the highest-ranked player (ATP ranking of no. 128) who lost in the finals of qualifying. After beating Ivo Karlović in the first round, he lost to world no. 4 David Ferrer in the second round in four sets.

Tim lost the first round of the 2013 French Open qualifying. He fared better at Wimbledon; he made it to the third round of qualifying for the first time, losing to Matt Reid in four sets. Tim reached the doubles final of the 2013 Hall of Fame Tennis Championships with Rhyne Williams as his partner. In the final the American duo fell to Nicolas Mahut and his partner and fellow Frenchmen Edouard Roger-Vasselin. Tim made it to the third round of the Citi Open. He qualified for the Rogers Cup and made it to the second round.

At the 2015 Australian Open, Smyczek entered the main draw as a qualifier, and lost in a four-hour match that ended 7–5 in the fifth set against World No. 3 Rafael Nadal in the second round. In the final game of the match, he graciously allowed Nadal to repeat a crucial first serve when Nadal’s serve landed out, possibly due to a disturbance by a member of the crowd. Smyczek (not the chair umpire) initiated the decision for Nadal to repeat the first serve. Smyczek’s sportsmanship resulted in praise from Nadal and the crowd after the match. He would go on to achieve his career high rank of 68 in April.

In 2016 Smyczek made the quarterfinals in Houston and Delray Beach.

In 2018 Smyczek attained his best main tour result by reaching the semi-finals of Newport.

In 2019 Smyczek announced his plans to retire after the U.S. Open but was not granted a wild card. His last match was at the Citi Open.

ATP career finals

Doubles: 1 (1 runner-up)

Challenger tournament finals

Singles (7–6)

Doubles (0–1)

Singles performance timeline

Current through the 2019 Citi Open.

References

External links
 
 
 
 

1987 births
Living people
American male tennis players
Sportspeople from Milwaukee
Tennis players from Tampa, Florida
Tennis people from Wisconsin
American people of Polish descent
American Roman Catholics